Radu Petre Guran (born March 5, 1972) is a Romanian historian, member of the World Academy of Art and Science. In 2003, he got a Ph.D from the School for Advanced Studies in the Social Sciences. He has been the first director of the Romanian Cultural Institute "Mihai Eminescu" in Chişinău since September 2010.

References

External links 
 Petre Guran
 Romanian Cultural Institute, Petre Guran, director
 Timpul de dimineață, Omul Săptămânii: Petre Guran, directorul Institutului Cultural Român „M. Eminescu” din Chişinău

1972 births
Writers from Bucharest
21st-century Romanian historians
Living people
Romanian Byzantinists